"Are You Not Entertained?" is a song by English rapper/producer Dot Rotten. The song was first released on 4 March 2012 in the United Kingdom as the second single from the rapper's upcoming debut studio album, Voices in My Head. The track debuted at number fifty-three on the UK Singles Chart, marking Rotten's second chart appearance after "Teardrop" (#24, 2011); also reaching number twenty-one on the UK R&B Chart.

The song also appeared on the soundtrack of the 2012 Codemasters video game Dirt: Showdown.

Music video
A music video to accompany the release of "Are You Not Entertained?" was first released onto YouTube on 6 January 2012 at a total length of three minutes and two seconds.

Live performances
As part of the Radio 1/Radio 1Xtra Hull takeover, Rotten performed the tracks "Keep it on a Low" and "Are You Not Entertained?" on 28 January – joining DJ Trevor Nelson at Hull University.

Track listing

Chart performance

Release history

References

2012 singles
Dot Rotten songs
Mercury Records singles
2012 songs
Music videos directed by Adam Powell
Song recordings produced by TMS (production team)
Songs written by Peter Kelleher (songwriter)
Songs written by Tom Barnes (songwriter)
Songs written by Ben Kohn